Rabia Şermi Kadın ("spring" and "tranquil"; died;  1732;) was a consort of Sultan Ahmed III and the mother of Sultan Abdul Hamid I.

Life

Her birthplace and date are unknown. On 20 March 1725 she gave birth to her only son Şehzade Abdul Hamid. In 1728, when he was three she commissioned a fountain in Şemsipaşa, Üsküdar. Ahmed was deposed in 1730, and his nephew Mahmud I ascended the throne. Şermi along with other ladies of Ahmed's harem went to the Eski Palace, at Beyazıt Square.

Death and aftermath
Şermi died in 1732 leaving Abdul Hamid motherless at the age of seven he was then entrusted in the care of his elder half-brother Mustafa III, and was buried in the mausoleum of imperial ladies, in the New Mosque in Istanbul.

Abdul Hamid ascended the throne in 1774 after the death of his elder half brother Mustafa III. However, she was never Valide Sultan, as she had died forty two years before Abdul Hamid ascended the throne. He created the Beylerbeyi Mosque in memory of his mother.

Issue
Together with Ahmed, Şermi had one son:
 Abdul Hamid I (Topkapı Palace, 20 March 1725 - Istanbul, Turkey, 7 April 1789, buried in Tomb of Abdul Hamid I, Fatih, Istanbul). He was the 27° Sultan of the Ottoman Empire, after forty-four years of reclusion in the Kafes.

See also

Ottoman Empire
Ottoman dynasty
Ottoman family tree
List of sultans of the Ottoman Empire
Line of succession to the Ottoman throne
Ottoman Emperors family tree (simplified)
List of consorts of the Ottoman Sultans

References

1732 deaths
18th-century consorts of Ottoman sultans
Mothers of Ottoman sultans